Bang Eun-jin (born August 5, 1965) is a South Korean actress and film director. She is best known for starring in Park Chul-soo's 301, 302 and Kim Ki-duk's Address Unknown. Bang made her feature directorial debut with Princess Aurora in 2005, and has since directed Perfect Number (2012), and Way Back Home (2013).

Filmography

Director and screenwriter
 Method (2017)
 Way Back Home (2013)
 Perfect Number (2012)
 Blue Birds on the Desk (short film from omnibus If You Were Me 4, 2008)
 Puff the Rice (short film, 2007)
 Princess Aurora (2005)
 Ain't No Maid (short film, 2004)

Actress

Film
 The Naked Kitchen (2009) (cameo)
 A Light Sleep (2009) (cameo)
 Crush and Blush (2008)
 Bleach (2008)
 Nowhere to Turn (2008) (voice cameo)
 Tool (2006)
 Salt: Korean Railway Women Workers Story (2003)
 Rewind (2002)
 Road Movie (2002)
 My Beautiful Days (2002)
 No Comment (2002)
 Scent of Love (2001)
 Address Unknown (2001)
 Doomealee, The Very First Step (2000)
 Gui: A Space between Two Deaths (2000)
 Subrosa (2000)
 Black Hole (2000)
 The Uprising (1999)
 The Wooden Closet (1998)
 Rub Love (1998)
 Birdcage Inn (1998)
 Reclaiming Our Names (1998)
 Push! Push! (1997)
 Do You Believe in Jazz? (1997)
 Farewell My Darling (1997)
 Seven Reasons Why Beer is Better Than a Lover (1996)
 301, 302 (1995)
 Mom, the Star and the Sea Anemone (1994)
 The Taebaek Mountains (1994)

Television series
 My Too Perfect Sons (KBS2, 2009)
 Foolish Love (KBS2, 2000)
 목마들의 언덕 (KBS2, 2000)
 Wang Rung's Land (SBS, 2000)
 Crash Landing on You (tvN, 2019)

Awards
 2006 Golden Cinematography Awards: Best New Director (Princess Aurora)
 2005 Women in Film Korea Awards: Woman Filmmaker of the Year (Princess Aurora)
 2005 Korean Association of Film Critics Awards: Best New Director (Princess Aurora)
 2002 Grand Bell Awards: Best Supporting Actress (Address Unknown)
 1996 Korean Association of Film Critics Awards: Best Actress (301, 302)
 1995 Blue Dragon Film Awards: Best Actress (301, 302)
 1995 Chunsa Film Art Awards: Best Actress (301, 302)
 1993 Baeksang Arts Awards: Best New Actress
 1992 Seoul Performing Arts Festival: Best Actress

Other activities
 2010 Full-time faculty at College of Convergence Culture and Arts, Sungshin Women's University
 2010 9th Mise-en-scène Short Film Festival - Jury chairman
 2009 11th Seoul International Youth Film Festival - Jury
 2006 7th Jeonju International Film Festival - Jury, Indie Vision section
 2004 Adjunct professor of Film at Seoul Institute of the Arts

References

External links
 
 
 

South Korean film actresses
South Korean television actresses
South Korean women film directors
South Korean film directors
South Korean screenwriters
Actresses from Seoul
1965 births
Living people
Seoul Institute of the Arts alumni